The Peter Debye Award in Physical Chemistry is awarded annually by the American Chemical Society "to encourage and reward outstanding research in physical chemistry". The award is named after Peter Debye and
granted without regard to age or nationality.

Recipients 

2020 Laura Gagliardi  
2019 Daniel M. Neumark
2018 
2017 
2016 Mark A. Ratner
2015 Xiaoliang Sunney Xie
2014 Henry F. Schaefer III
2013 William E. Moerner
2012 David Chandler
2011 Louis E. Brus
2010 George Schatz
2009 Richard J. Saykally
2008 Michael L. Klein
2007 John T. Yates, Jr.
2006 Donald Truhlar
2005 Stephen Leone
2004 William Carl Lineberger
2003 William H. Miller
2002 Giacinto Scoles
2001 John Ross
2000 Peter G. Wolynes
1999 Jesse L. Beauchamp
1998 Graham R. Fleming
1997 Robin M. Hochstrasser
1996 Ahmed Zewail
1995 John C. Tully
1994 William A. Klemperer
1993 F. Sherwood Rowland
1992 Frank H. Stillinger
1991 Richard N. Zare
1990 Harden M. McConnell
1989 Gabor A. Somorjai
1988 Rudolph A. Marcus
1987 Harry G. Drickamer
1986 Yuan T. Lee
1985 Stuart A. Rice
1984 B. Seymour Rabinovitch
1983 George C. Pimentel
1982 Peter M. Rentzepis
1981 Richard B. Bernstein
1976 Robert W. Zwanzig
1975 Herbert S. Gutowsky
1974 Walter H. Stockmayer
1973 William N. Lipscomb, Jr.
1972 Clyde A. Hutchison, Jr.
1971 Norman Davidson
1970 
1969 Paul J. Flory
1968 George B. Kistiakowsky
1967 Joseph E. Mayer
1966 Joseph O. Hirschfelder
1965 Lars Onsager
1964 Henry Eyring
1963 Robert S. Mulliken
1962 E. Bright Wilson, Jr.

See also

 List of chemistry awards

References 

Awards of the American Chemical Society
Physical chemistry
Awards established in 1962
Peter Debye